Saint Joseph's Roman Catholic Church is a historic church at 322 3rd Street SE in Massillon, Ohio.

The designer was John Verment, a French-born architect who also contributed to the design of St. Mary's Catholic Church elsewhere in Massillon.

It was added to the National Register in 2010.

References

External links
 Official website
National Register nomination form

Churches in the Roman Catholic Diocese of Youngstown
Churches on the National Register of Historic Places in Ohio
Gothic Revival church buildings in Ohio
National Register of Historic Places in Stark County, Ohio
Churches in Massillon, Ohio